In the run up to the 2023 Spanish general election, various organisations carry out opinion polling to gauge voting intention in Spain during the term of the 14th Cortes Generales. Results of such polls are displayed in this article. The date range for these opinion polls is from the previous general election, held on 10 November 2019, to the present day. This article displays polls conducted between 2019 and 2021.

Voting intention estimates refer mainly to a hypothetical Congress of Deputies election. Polls are listed in reverse chronological order, showing the most recent first and using the dates when the survey fieldwork was done, as opposed to the date of publication. Where the fieldwork dates are unknown, the date of publication is given instead. The highest percentage figure in each polling survey is displayed with its background shaded in the leading party's colour. If a tie ensues, this is applied to the figures with the highest percentages. The "Lead" columns on the right shows the percentage-point difference between the parties with the highest percentages in a poll.

The tables below list nationwide voting intention estimates. Refusals are generally excluded from the party vote percentages, while question wording and the treatment of "don't know" responses and those not intending to vote may vary between polling organisations. When available, seat projections determined by the polling organisations are displayed below (or in place of) the percentages in a smaller font; 176 seats are required for an absolute majority in the Congress of Deputies.

Polling

2021

2020

2019

Notes

References